Conospermum brownii, commonly known as blue-eyed smokebush, is a shrub endemic to Western Australia.

It blooms between August and December producing blue-white flowers.

It is found in the Wheatbelt and Goldfields-Esperance regions of Western Australia where it grows in sandy soils often over laterite.

References

External links

brownii
Endemic flora of Western Australia
Eudicots of Western Australia
Plants described in 1848
Taxa named by Carl Meissner